Anansia is a monotypic genus of Angolan araneomorph spiders in the family Tetrablemmidae containing the single species, Anansia astaroth. It was first described by Pekka T. Lehtinen in 1981, and is found in Angola.

See also
 List of Tetrablemmidae species

References

Endemic fauna of Angola
Monotypic Araneomorphae genera
Spiders of Africa
Taxa named by Pekka T. Lehtinen
Tetrablemmidae